Orthogonius hopei is a species of ground beetle in the subfamily Orthogoniinae. It was described by George Robert Gray in 1832.

This species has been cited from India and Malay Peninsula. It has also been recorded from Singapore in 2007.

References

Original description

hopei
Beetles described in 1832
Taxa named by George Robert Gray